Scythris canescens is a moth of the family Scythrididae. It was described by Staudinger in 1880. It is found in Morocco, Algeria, Tunisia, Libya, Turkey, Syria, Iran, Afghanistan and Pakistan.

References

canescens
Moths described in 1880
Moths of Africa
Moths of the Middle East
Taxa named by Otto Staudinger